Yoshisuke (written: 義介, 義助, 義祐 or 良弼) is a masculine Japanese given name. Notable people with the name include:

, Japanese businessman and politician; founder of the Nissan group
, Japanese samurai
Fujiwara no Yoshisuke (813–867), Japanese courtier and politician
, Japanese daimyō
, Japanese samurai
, Japanese daimyō

Japanese masculine given names